The 1957 Yorkshire Cup was the 50th occasion on which the Yorkshire Cup competition had been held. Huddersfield won the trophy by beating York by the score of 15-8.

Results
This season there were no junior/amateur clubs taking part, no new entrants and no "leavers" and so the total of entries remained the  same at sixteen.

This in turn resulted in no byes in the first round.

Round 1 
Round 1 involved 8 matches (with no byes) and 16 clubs.

Round 2 - quarterfinals 
Involved 4 matches and 8 clubs

Round 3 – semifinals  
Involved 2 matches and 4 clubs

Semifinal - replays  
Involved  1 match and 2 clubs

Final 
The match was played at Headingley, Leeds, now in West Yorkshire. The attendance was 22,531 and receipts were £4,123.

Teams and scorers 

Scoring - Try = three (3) points - Goal = two (2) points - Drop goal = two (2) points

The road to success

See also 
1957–58 Northern Rugby Football League season
Rugby league county cups

References

External links
Saints Heritage Society
1896–97 Northern Rugby Football Union season at wigan.rlfans.com
Hull&Proud Fixtures & Results 1896/1897
Widnes Vikings - One team, one passion Season In Review - 1896-97
The Northern Union at warringtonwolves.org

1957 in English rugby league
RFL Yorkshire Cup